The 1989–90 New Jersey Nets season was the Nets' 23rd season in the National Basketball Association, and 14th season in East Rutherford, New Jersey. The Nets decided to start the rebuilding process by acquiring Sam Bowie from the Portland Trail Blazers on draft day. Under new head coach Bill Fitch, they started the season winning their first two games, but went on to lose eleven of their next twelves games, including a nine-game losing streak. At midseason, the team acquired Chris Dudley from the Cleveland Cavaliers. The Nets struggled all season long posting a 14-game losing streak between January and February, and losing eleven consecutive games in March. They lost their final seven games of the season, finishing last place in the Atlantic Division with a league worst record at 17–65. Following the season, Dennis Hopson was traded to the Chicago Bulls.

Draft picks

Roster

Regular season

Season standings

Record vs. opponents

Schedule

Player statistics

Awards, records and honors

References

 New Jersey Nets on Database Basketball
 New Jersey Nets on Basketball Reference

New Jersey Nets season
New Jersey Nets seasons
New Jersey Nets
New Jersey Nets
20th century in East Rutherford, New Jersey
Meadowlands Sports Complex